Ohio held its elections October 11, 1814.

See also 
 Ohio's 6th congressional district special election, 1814
 United States House of Representatives elections, 1814 and 1815
 List of United States representatives from Ohio

Notes 

1814
Ohio
United States House of Representatives